"I" is the second and final single from Taproot's album Gift. The song is one of the most melodic tracks from the album. "I" was the most successful single from the album, charting at no. 34 on the Mainstream Rock Chart.

Track listing

Chart positions

Personnel
 Stephen Richards – vocals
 Mike DeWolf – guitar
 Phil Lipscomb – bass
 Jarrod Montague – drums

External links
 Lyrics at AllMusic

References

2001 singles
Atlantic Records singles
Taproot (band) songs
Songs written by Stephen Richards (musician)
2000 songs